Yana Berezhna (born 17 January 1997) is a Ukrainian Paralympic swimmer.

Career
She represented Ukraine at the 2012 Summer Paralympics in London, United Kingdom and she won the silver medal in the women's 100 metre breaststroke SB11 event. She also represented Ukraine at the 2016 Summer Paralympics and she did not win a medal at that event. In 2021, she won the bronze medal in the women's 100 metre breaststroke SB11 event at the 2020 Summer Paralympics in Tokyo, Japan.

At the 2018 World Para Swimming European Championships she won the silver medal in the women's 100 metres breaststroke SB11 event and the bronze medal in the women's 200 metres individual medley SB11 event.

At the 2019 World Para Swimming Championships held in London, United Kingdom, she won the bronze medal in the women's 100 metres breaststroke SB11 event.

References

External links 
 

Living people
1997 births
Ukrainian female breaststroke swimmers
Paralympic swimmers of Ukraine
Swimmers at the 2012 Summer Paralympics
Swimmers at the 2016 Summer Paralympics
Swimmers at the 2020 Summer Paralympics
Medalists at the 2012 Summer Paralympics
Medalists at the 2020 Summer Paralympics
Medalists at the World Para Swimming Championships
Paralympic silver medalists for Ukraine
Paralympic bronze medalists for Ukraine
Paralympic medalists in swimming
People from Kremenchuk
S11-classified Paralympic swimmers
Sportspeople from Poltava Oblast
21st-century Ukrainian women